Janvier Airport  is located near Janvier, Alberta, Canada. It is also close to the Janvier 194 Indian reserve.

References

Registered aerodromes in Alberta
Transport in the Regional Municipality of Wood Buffalo